GamePro TV is a syndicated weekly video game television show that ran from 1991 through 1992. The show was a low-budget partner to GamePro magazine.

History

First-run syndication version
Hosted by J. D. Roth (and, initially, co-host Brennan Howard), the program showcased many new and upcoming video games, largely for the NES, Super NES, Game Boy, Sega Genesis and TurboGrafx-16 systems. Viewers could send in recordings of themselves explaining tips and codes for games, one of which was chosen to be shown in each of the early episodes. Viewer mail was also frequently answered on-air.

Paid advertisement version
After its initial cancellation as a syndicated weekly series, GamePro TV was reborn as a paid advertisement program (usually airing in places like the USA Network and Sci-Fi Channel). The infomercial version of GameProTV consistently ran a 1-800 number along the bottom of the screen inviting viewers to subscribe to GamePro magazine. These episodes utilized the same sets as the syndicated program and retained J. D. Roth as host, but removed the option for viewers to send in tips or questions by mail. The half-hour ads ran for less than a year before GamePro TV finally vanished from the airwaves.

Fox Sports Net version
In 1998, GamePro TV returned to the airwaves, this time with a different host (Michael Komessar), and a largely different format. This version of the show was produced by Timeline and aired on various Fox Sports Net channels in New England, Ohio, Chicago and the Bay Area. Reviews, previews, tips and interviews with press and developers were present in this version, utilizing the same themes and formats from the magazine. Review scores were lifted directly from the magazine as well. However, this version was short-lived, airing only a few episodes before its cancellation in early 1999.

GamePro Minute
In 2003, a new abbreviated version of GamePro TV titled the GamePro Minute appeared on the short-lived series GSN Video Games on Game Show Network.

See also
Bad Influence!
GamesMaster
Starcade
Video Power
Video & Arcade Top 10

External links 
 
 Collection of streaming GamePro TV episodes
 Full GamePro TV Episode
 GamePro TV Spain
 Retrojunk Archive - GamePro TV Archive
 Playing With Power: Tips, Tricks, and Television

Television shows about video games
1990 American television series debuts
1991 American television series endings
1998 American television series debuts
1999 American television series endings
First-run syndicated television programs in the United States
Fox Sports Networks original programming
American television series revived after cancellation
Infomercials
Television series by MGM Television